Attendorf is a former municipality in the district of Graz-Umgebung in the Austrian state of Styria. Since the 2015 Styria municipal structural reform, it is part of the municipality Hitzendorf.

Geography
Attendorf lies about 10 km southwest of Graz on the Lusenbach, a tributary of the Kainach.

References

Cities and towns in Graz-Umgebung District